CompEx (meaning Competency in Ex atmospheres) is a global certification scheme for electrical and mechanical craftspersons and designers working in potentially explosive atmospheres. The scheme is operated by JTLimited, UK and is accredited by UKAS to ISO/IEC 17024. 

The scheme was created by EEMUA (Engineering Equipment and Materials Users' Association) to satisfy the general competency requirements of BS EN 60079 (IEC 60079), parts 10, 14 and 17. The requirements are currently explicitly detailed in IEC 60079 Part 14 Annex A, detailing knowledge/skills and competency requirements for responsible persons, operatives and designers.

The scheme is broken down to twelve units covering different actions and hazardous area concepts.

In 2017, CompEx 01-04 was introduced to the NEC Standard.  NEC500 & also NEC505, along with Ex "f" Foundation Courses.   There are provided by Eaton.

See also
 ATEX directive
 Electrical Equipment in Hazardous Areas

References

Further reading

External links
 https://www.compex.org.uk/

Electrical safety
Explosion protection